In Aztec mythology the Lords of the Day are a set of thirteen gods that ruled over a particular day corresponding to one of the thirteen heavens. They were cyclical, so that the same god recurred every thirteen days. In the Aztec calendar, the lords of the day are

 Xiuhtecuhtli, god of fire and time.
 Tlaltecuhtli, god of the earth.
 Chalchiuhtlicue, goddess of water, lakes, rivers, seas, streams, horizontal waters, storms and baptism.
 Tonatiuh, god of the sun.
 Tlazolteotl, goddess of lust, carnality, sexual misdeeds.
 Mictlantecuhtli, god of the underworld.
 Centeotl, goddess of maize. Also recognized as Chicomecoatl, goddess of agriculture.
 Tlaloc, god of the thunder, rain and earthquakes.
 Quetzalcoatl, god of wisdom, life, knowledge, morning star, fertility, patron of the winds and the light, the lord of the West.
 Tezcatlipoca, god of providence, matter and the invisible, ruler of the night, Great Bear, impalpable, ubiquity and the twilight, the lord of the North.
 Mictecacihuatl, goddess of the underworld.
 Tlahuizcalpantecuhtli, god of dawn.
 Citlalicue, goddess of the female stars (Milky Way).

Sources 

Aztec mythology and religion
Mesoamerican calendars
Mesoamerican mythology and religion
Aztec calendars
Maya calendars